Patrick Moya (born 1955 in Troyes, France), is a Southern French artist, living in Nice on the French Riviera. Moya has been at the forefront since the 1970s of straddling the latest forms of media and technology. He is an early pioneer of video art in the metaverse, working in Second Life since July 2007.

Early life and career
Moya arrived in Nice at the age of fifteen. He studied Fine Arts at the Villa Arson for three years. Inspired by the theory of Marshall McLuhan, he invented a TV show  called Bonzour Bonzour where he is a TV artist. It was his first experimentation in video art.

For ten years, he was hired as a nude model for the art students. In the 80's, he began working with the letters of his name, MOYA, saying that «the art is the signature».

This spawned the practice of using the letters of his name in his art which he has put on as many surfaces as possible, often in the background of his paintings or in sculpture, in a celebratory way which has become his trademark. Being a model meanwhile taught him to objectify himself so he could later insert himself as the medium in his own work after realizing that "with the ubiquity of broadcast media, the creator had to invent himself as a creature" to ride out and embrace New Media.

In 1991, he participated at a Sculptures Symposium in Asia (Taiwan), making a big sculpture with the letters of his name (Kaohsiung Museum of Fine Arts, Taiwan)

in 1996, he invented an alter ego, "moya", a self-portrait inspired by Pinocchio, in order to "become part of his art work".

In 1999 a character named "Dolly" appeared, a little sheep inspired by the famous cloned sheep (Dolly). Today, Dolly is a central figure of the "Moya Land".

In June 2007, was inaugurated by Christian Estrosi (then Minister for Overseas), interior fresco of a chapel in the village of Clans : this painting, made from self-portraits of the artist, tells the story of St John the Baptist.

Since 1985, he began making digital using a Thomson MO5. He also used celluloid as medium on which to scratch his name and play it back as film art/art film. He never stop to use computer in his art, making 3D images, then 3D videos, until 2007, where he discover the "Second Life" environment : there, he built his Moya Land and by extension, has spread the Moya label to the virtual frontier. In his subversive global art work, he regularly includes live and interactive performances between him and the public, using the virtual environment and has done collaborations with Thierry Mugler.

In 2009, he participated in the first major exhibition about "Art in Second Life", under the title "Rinascimento Virtuale ». It was in the museum of Anthropology of Florence, the City of the Renaissance, where an entire room was devoted to the "Moya civilization".

In summer 2011, the story of Moya civilization was depicted on the walls of the art center La Malmaison, in Cannes. This exhibition, also built in SL, allowed visitors to meet the artist from a distance, to ask questions and to visit with him his virtual Moya Land.

In May 2015, a new biography was published, "Le cas Moya" (« Moya case »), who proved the coherence of his work : Moya wrote his name (1979/1989) - Moya tagged anonymous images with his name (1990 /1996) - Little "moya" appeared alone in his work (1996 /1999) - Moya created his 2D universe (1999 /2007) - Moya became Master of his 3D universe (2007/2015). The dream of Moya is coming true : "to be Tintin rather Hergé, The Joconde rather Leonardo da Vinci … To be a Creature living in his art work, living a second life of a Creature playing to be an Artist".

Artworks 
Moya is a prolific artist touching on everything from artistic happening, live painting, ceramics, computer, drawings, fashion art, muralism, painting, projection art, sculpture and video art - up to now. His body of work has been inventoried in a catalogue raisonné that comprises over 4500 pieces in the span of 40 years between 1971 and 2011. His work has been plastered on the city of Cannes's public transport system's mini-buses, on cars (Porsche, Fiat 500, Deux-chevaux, Smart, Gordini…), on cows from "Cow Parades" and cowbells, on designer clothes and promotional USB cards issued by Cannes's Hotel Martinez, as well as France's famous Guide Michelin. He has also designed dolls for UNICEF. Moya is one of the very few modern artists to be commissioned to paint a Catholic church, dedicated to Saint Jean Baptiste in Clans.

His frescos can be found in public buildings in Monaco (namely the Princess Grace hospital), in a college ("La Bourgade" in La Trinité), in Pasteur 2 Hospital (2015). And in two "Moya chapels", in Clans and Le Mas, two small villages of Alpes Maritimes.

Moya become a digital artist since his early work on computer in the mid-80s : now, since 2007, he is the owner of a virtual Moya Land in the 3D web of Second Life.

Today, Moya is living between real and virtual Worlds, and, with his avatar, he answers to journalist (Radio Canada, 2013), to students (school of Fine Arts of Venice, Quebec, Zurich or Milan), participates or organize many exhibitions, real or virtual, reproduces Art Fairs or Museums (Palais de Tokyo in Paris, Ceramics Museum in Vallauris …), works with a chief (Christian Sinicropi of Restaurant "La Palme d'Or" in Cannes)  ... Or receive visitors worldwide and makes for them a guiding tour in a virtual car !

Some personal exhibitions 
 1987 : « Les Caprices de Moya », Galerie municipale des Ponchettes, Nice, France
 1995 : « The sculpture exhibition of Moya », Kaohsiung Museum of Fine Art, Taiwan
 1996 : « MOYA-MOYA », MAMAC, Nice, France
 2003 :  « L'Arsenal de Moya », Rétrospective, L'Arsenal, Metz, France
 2006 : « L'Arche de Moya », Toit de la Grande Arche de La Défense, Paris, France
 2011 : « La Civilisation Moya », Centre d'art La Malmaison, Cannes, France
 2013 :  "Moya in the classics", Radium art Center, Busan, South Korea 
 2013 : « L'Universo Moya a Dronero », Teatro Iris, Dronero, Italy
 2015 : "Moya en abondance", Collégiale St Pierre-la-Cour, Le Mans, France
 2015 : « Moya Circus », Museo d'Arte Contemporanea (MAC 3), Caserta, Italy
 2015 : "Moya", Miller White Fine Arts, Cape Cod, USA
 2016 : « Il laboratoire delle metamorfosi », Cantina, Palazzo ducale, Mantoux, Italy
 2016 (juin/août) : Voyage au Moya Land, Château Madame de Graffigny, Villers-lès-Nancy
 2017/2018 (décembre/mars) : Le cas Moya, l'exposition, Galerie Lympia (Espace Culturel Départemental, Conseil Départemental 06), Nice
 2018 (avril) : Dolly mon amour, Palazzo Saluzzo Paesana, Turin (Italie)
 2019 (mars) : Moya Royal Transmedia, Reggia di Caserta, Caserta (Italie)
 2020 (juin-novembre) : La Collection Moya, musée Masséna, Nice (France)
 2020/2021 : (28 novembre 2020 / 4 décembre 2021), La Télé de Moya, centre d'art L’Artistique, Nice.

Philosophy 
MOYA works in a "tree structure", working between real work and virtual worlds, in an invasive and immersive approach that takes its name and image as a pretext. With the goal of becoming a "creature who lives in his work". A goal achieved in 2007, through his avatar, when he moved to Second Life, where he reconstructed his artistic universe in the form of 3D pixels, becoming one of the first “metaverse artists”.
Moya's maxim has been "to please everybody while remaining avant-garde; to be everywhere without wasting oneself; to touch each medium while staying perfectly recognizable". He credits his time as a nude model for his healthy degree of exhibitionism and narcissism that gets duplicated as his cartoon alter ego. The result is art that crosses generations and genders. His work is often described as positive and jubilant.

Charity 
Moya has participated in projects to benefit AIDS in Monaco, and UNICEF.

References

External links
 Official site
 Catalogue raisonné
 YouTube channel

French conceptual artists
French installation artists
French video artists
1955 births
People from Troyes
Living people